The Women's 5000m athletics event for the 2016 Summer Paralympics took place at the Estádio Olímpico João Havelange from September 14 to September 15, 2016. A single event was contested over this distance for the T54 classifications.

Schedule

Medal summary

T54

References

Athletics at the 2016 Summer Paralympics